Qaleh-ye Azari may refer to:
 Qaleh-ye Azari, Alborz